The 2019–20 UAE Pro League was the 46th edition of the UAE Pro League. On 26 April 2019, Khor Fakkan won the first division title over Al Taawon 3–0; this is their inaugural appearance on the pro league as Khor Fakkan Club as they were previously known as Al Khaleej, having been absent from the Pro League for twelve years. Hatta later returned to the pro league after a 1–0 away victory against Al Hamriyah secured them a spot on the first division after getting relegated a year ago. Sharjah are the defending champions. The League was put on hold on March due to the COVID-19 pandemic, however on June, with the majority of 12 out of 14 clubs votes, the league was cancelled and the champion is yet to be decided. On 18th of June, it was declared that this season will end with no champion despite Shabab Al-Ahli  leading the table with 43 points and the same teams that qualified for the 2020 AFC Champions League will qualify for the 2021 AFC Champions League.

Team changes

To Division 1 
Relegated to UAE Division 1
Emirates
Dibba Al Fujairah

From Division 1 
Promoted to UAE Pro League
Khor Fakkan
Hatta

Stadia and locations

Note: Table lists clubs in alphabetical order.

Personnel and kits 

Note: Flags indicate national team as has been defined under FIFA eligibility rules. Players may hold more than one non-FIFA nationality.

Foreign players 
All teams could register as many foreign players as they want, but could only use four on the field each game.

Players name in bold indicates the player is registered during the mid-season transfer window.
Players in italics were out of the squad or left the club within the season, after the pre-season transfer window, or in the mid-season transfer window, and at least had one appearance.

Managerial changes

League table

Results

Season statistics

Top goalscorers

Hat-tricks

Notes
4 Player scored 4 goals(H) – Home team(A) – Away team

Positions by round

Attendances

By round

Number of teams by Emirates

References

UAE Pro League seasons
1
UAE
UAE Pro League